Made in USA is an album by Sonic Youth, containing music the band scored for the 1987 film of the same name. The band recorded this material in 1986, shortly after the completion of their album EVOL, but the album was not released until 1995. A soundtrack for the film was also released in 1987, but unlike this release, did not contain any of the original score the band created for the film. Rehearsal demos for these sessions were released in 2016, as Spinhead Sessions • 1986,

Track listing
"Mackin' for Doober" – 0:51
"Full Chrome Logic" – 0:59
"Secret Girl" – 2:55
"Cork Mountain Incident" – 0:49
"Moustache Riders" – 1:07
"Tuck N Dar" – 3:40
"Moon in the Bathroom" – 2:29
"Thought Bubbles" – 2:25
"Rim Thrusters" – 1:59
"Lincoln's Gout" – 2:08
"Coughing Up Tweed" – 1:17
"Pre-Poured Wood" – 0:52
"Hairpiece Lullaby 1 & 2" – 2:08
"Pocketful of Sen-Sen" – 1:15
"Smoke Blisters 1 & 2" – 2:33
"The Velvet Plug" – 2:31
"Giggles" – 0:53
"Tulip Fire 2" – 1:56
"The Dynamics of Bulbing" – 1:17
"Smoke Blisters 3 & 4" – 3:20
"O.J.'s Glove or What?" – 1:20
"Webb of Mud 1, 2 & 3" – 2:51
"Bachelors in Fur!" – 1:00

Spinhead Sessions - 1986

Spinhead Sessions - 1986 is an album by Sonic Youth, containing rehearsals of music the band were preparing for the 1987 film of the same name. The album was announced in April 2016. The band recorded this material in 1986, at Spinhead Studios, shortly after the completion of their album EVOL.

Track listing
"Ambient Guitar & Dreamy Theme" - 16:39
"Theme With Noise" - 4:16
"High Mesa" - 8:36
"Unknown Theme" - 2:41
"Wolf" - 1:37
"Scalping" - 3:57
"Theme 1 Take 4" - 2:32

References

External links

1995 soundtrack albums
2016 albums
Sonic Youth soundtracks
Rhino Records soundtracks
Drama film soundtracks
Comedy film soundtracks